So Amazing may refer to:

Songs
 "So Amazing" (song), by Luther Vandross, originally performed by Dionne Warwick, for the 1983 album How Many Times Can We Say Goodbye and covered by many other artists
 "So Amazing", by  Boyz II Men from the 2000 compilation album The Ballad Collection
 "So Amazing", by 50 Cent from the 2005 album The Massacre
 "So Amazing", by Jagged Edge from the 2006 album Jagged Edge
 "So Amazing", by Livin Out Loud from the 2006 album What About Us, a tribute to the victims of Hurricane Katrina

Albums
 So Amazing: An All-Star Tribute to Luther Vandross, 2005 tribute album to singer Luther Vandross
 So Amazin', 2006 album by Christina Milian
 So Amazing (Planetshakers album), 2001 live album by Australian Christian rock band Planetshakers

See also 
 It's So Amazing, a 1999 children's book about pregnancy and childbirth